Wang Xing (born 18 February 1979) is a Chinese businessman and computer engineer who is the of Meituan-Dianping. Fortune listed Wang as number three on its 2018 "40 under 40" list. Forbes estimates his net worth at US$8.9 billion as of November 2022.

Early life and education 
Wang Xing was born in 1979 in Longyan, Fujian, China. He graduated from Tsinghua University with a bachelor’s degree in electronic engineering in 2001. He pursued a Ph.D. in computer engineering at University of Delaware from 2001 to 2004 but then dropped out of the program. Nevertheless, in 2005, he received a master's degree in computer engineering from University of Delaware.

Business career 
After dropping out of University of Delaware, Wang returned to China to launch his business career. In his first technology startup, Wang along with a couple of friends, tried to create a Chinese version of the then-social networking site Friendster. His first such site was called Duoduoyou ("Many Friends"), targeting students in various Chinese universities. After Duoduoyou failed to take off, he started Youzitu to serve Chinese students abroad but the site was shut down.

In 2005, Wang created a Chinese version of Facebook called Xiaonei ("On Campus"). The site was a hit but Wang had to sell it off due to financial problems. The new owners re-branded the site, which is now called Renren ("Everybody").

In 2007, Wang created a Chinese version of Twitter called Fanfou. It was China's first big microblogging site but was soon shut down by the government over politically sensitive content. It was eventually permitted to reopen but by then, other Chinese microblogging sites like Sina Weibo and Tencent Weibo had entered the market and captured substantial market share.

In 2010, Wang established the Chinese group-buying site Meituan, which was based on the business model of Groupon. Meituan was hugely successful and merged with Dianping in 2015.

Controversy

Politics 
On 3 May 2021, Wang posted a Tang Dynasty (618–907 AD) poem about book burning on Fanfou, a social media platform owned by himself an action widely seen as a veiled swipe against Chinese Communist Party General Secretary Xi Jinping's administration's clampdown on civil society, intellectual and academic freedom since ascension to office. The poem, entitled "Book Burning Pit"  speaks about the late emperor Qin Shi Huang's practice of beheading scholars and burning books, only to be overthrown by illiterate rebels later during his reign. 

As a result of the post, Meituan's shares plunged 7.1% on the same day, wiping $36.98 billion from the company's market cap over the subsequent weeks. The firm also subsequently came under scrutiny from the Beijing Municipal Human Resources and Social Security Bureau and became the target of an anti-monopoly investigation from the State Administration of Market Regulation, widely seen as political reprisal for Wang's comments.

References 

1979 births
Living people
21st-century Chinese businesspeople
Billionaires from Fujian
Chinese chief executives
Chinese technology company founders
Meituan people
People from Longyan
Tsinghua University alumni
University of Delaware alumni